Argyle-Barrington was a provincial electoral district in  Nova Scotia, Canada, that elects one member of the Nova Scotia House of Assembly. The riding was created in 2012 with 100 per cent of the former district of Argyle and 52 per cent of the former district of Shelburne. It consists of the Municipality of Argyle, the town of Clark's Harbour, and the Municipality of Barrington. Fishing is the economic mainstay of the area, although manufacturing and the service sector are significant employers.

Members of the Legislative Assembly
This riding has elected the following Members of the Legislative Assembly:

Election results

|-

|Progressive Conservative
|Chris d'Entremont
|align="right"| 3,935
|align="right"| 54.69
|align="right"| N/A
|-

|Liberal
|Kent Blades
|align="right"| 2,905
|align="right"| 40.38
|align="right"| N/A
|-

|New Democratic Party
|Kenn Baynton
|align="right"| 355
|align="right"| 4.93
|align="right"| N/A
|-
 

|}

References

External links
 2013 riding profile

Nova Scotia provincial electoral districts